Floods in Saint Petersburg refer to a rise of water on the territory of St. Petersburg, a major city in Russia and its former capital. They are usually caused by the overflow of the delta of Neva River and surging water in the eastern part of Neva Bay but sometimes caused by melting snow. Floods are registered when the water rises above 160 cm with respect to a gauge at the Saint Petersburg Mining Institute. More than 300 floods have occurred since the city was founded in 1703.

The construction of Saint Petersburg Dam, started in 1978 and completed in 2011, is expected to protect the city from devastating floods. The dam is the last completed part of the Saint Petersburg Ring Road. Its first use to hold back the incoming Baltic water into Neva bay took place 28 November 2011 and had resulted in decrease of water rise to 1.3 MASL, that is below flood level equal to 1.6 masl, which prevented the 309th flood in the history of the city and saved some 1.3 billion roubles of possible damage.

Causes
Floods in St. Petersburg are caused by several factors. Cyclones, originating in the Baltic Sea with a prevalence of west winds, induce a "slow" matched Kelvin wave to rise and move towards the delta of Neva River where it meets the natural river flow moving in the opposite direction. The water level rises because of the shallowness of Neva Bay, flatness of its bottom and the narrowing of the Gulf of Finland near the delta. Seiches, onsets and another factors also contribute to the floods. Besides flooding as a result of storm surges, in 1903, 1921 and 1956 floods were caused by the melting of snow.

History

Prior to the founding of St. Petersburg in 1703, the largest flood occurred in 1691. Knowing about frequent floods from the locals, the Swedes laid the fortress Nyenschantz and the city of Nyen away from the delta upstream of the Neva River, at the confluence of the river Ohta to Neva.

The first flood in St. Petersburg city occurred 3 months after its founding, on the night of 19 to 20 August 1703. The water rose more than 2 meters. The water rose much higher on 20 September 1706, which in his letter to Alexander Menshikov, Peter I described as "the west-south-west wind brought the flood undescribed before. In my offices, it stood 21 inches above the floor, and people traveled by boats through the city streets. Yet it did not last long, less than 3 hours. And it was amusing to see people on the roofs and trees... Water was high, but didn't cause much harm ".

Engineering measures were instituted in the early 18th century, and the central part of the city was flooded by only 130–150 cm. Floods are registered in St. Petersburg when water rises above 160 cm at the level gauge at the Saint Petersburg Mining Institute; floods up to 210 cm are considered dangerous, up to 299 cm very dangerous and above 300 cm catastrophic. Of the 324 floods in the history of St. Petersburg, three were catastrophic.

Most floods occur in between September and December. Between 1703 and 2003, 324 floods were recorded with the height above 160 cm, of which 210 were higher than 210 cm. Some years have had several floods (five in 1752), and there are periods in which no flooding occurred (e.g. 1744–1752).

Largest floods

The following table lists the 50 largest floods between 1703 and 2003. The largest flood occurred in 1824 and killed several hundred people. This flood inspired the poem The Bronze Horseman by Alexander Pushkin.

A recent large flood (239 cm) occurred on 8–9 January 2005 caused by the cyclone Erwin. Six metro stations were closed. There were three floods in 2008, all below 200 centimeters.

Protective dam

Construction of a complex of dams protecting St. Petersburg from the floods began in 1979 but was halted in the 1990s when 60% was completed. The construction was resumed in 2005 and the completed dam was inaugurated on 12 August 2011. The dam is also the last completed part of the Saint Petersburg Ring Road, providing direct roadway access from mainland to the Kotlin Island and Kronshtadt.

The first use of the dam to hold back the incoming Baltic water into Neva bay took place 28 November 2011, when a major storm came from Scandinavia and caused a surge wave. Closing the dam had resulted in decrease of water rise to 1.3 masl, that is below flood level equal to 1.6 masl, which prevented the flood and saved some 1.3 billion roubles of possible damage. Though the 309th flood in the history of the city happened a month later at 27—28 December 2011, when despite closing the dam gates heavy cyclone forced the water to rise up to 1.7 masl which couldn't make serious damage to the city. Specialists suppose that if there were no dam, there could have been level up to 2.3 masl with serious consequences.

See also
Geography of Saint Petersburg
History of Saint Petersburg

References

Saint Petersburg
1824 floods in Europe
1824 in the Russian Empire
History of Saint Petersburg
1824 disasters in the Russian Empire